Hatun Ukru (Quechua hatun big, ukru hole, pit, hollow, "big hollow", Hispanicized spelling Atunucro) is a   mountain in the Cordillera Central in the Andes of Peru, about  high. It is situated in the Lima Region, Huarochirí Province, Quinti District. Hatun Ukru lies southwest of a lake named P'itiqucha.

References

Mountains of Peru
Mountains of Lima Region